Danilovo is a rural locality (a village) in Kichmengskoye Rural Settlement, Kichmengsko-Gorodetsky District, Vologda Oblast, Russia. The population was 54 as of 2002.

Geography 
Danilovo is located 11 km northeast of Kichmengsky Gorodok (the district's administrative centre) by road. Dorozhkovo is the nearest rural locality.

References 

Rural localities in Kichmengsko-Gorodetsky District